Rubicon (run domain Beclin-1-interacting and cysteine-rich domain-containing protein) is a protein that in humans is encoded by the RUBCN gene. Rubicon is one of the few known negative regulators of autophagy, a cellular process that degrades unnecessary or damaged cellular components. Rubicon is recruited to its sites of action through interaction with the small GTPase Rab7, and impairs the autophagosome-lysosome fusion step of autophagy through inhibition of PI3KC3-C2 (class III phosphatidylinositol 3-kinase complex 2).

Negative modulation of Rubicon is associated with reduction of aging and aging-associated diseases: knockout of Rubicon increases lifespan in roundworms and female fruit flies, and in mice decreases kidney fibrosis and α-synuclein accumulation.

In addition to regulation of autophagy, Rubicon has been shown to be required for LC3-associated phagocytosis (LAP) and LC3-associated endocytosis (LANDO). Rubicon has also been shown to negatively regulate the innate immune response through direct interaction with multiple downstream regulatory molecules.

Structure 

Rubicon consists of 972 amino acids and has an N-terminal RUN domain, a middle region (MR), and a C-terminal Rubicon homology (RH) domain. 

The Rubicon homology domain is rich in cysteine residues and binds at least 4 divalent Zinc ions, forming zinc finger motifs. The structural basis for interaction between Rubicon and GTP-bound Rab7 has been experimentally determined (PDB ID: 6WCW).

Function 

The function of the N-terminal RUN domain are unknown, but it is required for autophagy suppression. The middle region contains the PI3K-binding domain (PIKBD), which mediates inhibition of PI3KC3-C2. The C-terminal Rubicon homology domain mediates interaction with Rab7, and is shared by other RH domain-containing autophagy regulatory proteins, including PLEKHM1 and Pacer (also known as RUBCNL, Rubicon-like Autophagy Enhancer).

Autophagy-dependent 
Rubicon suppresses autophagy through association with and inhibition of PI3KC3-C2. Specifically, Rubicon directly binds PI3KC3-C2 and inhibits recruitment of PI3KC3-C2 to the membrane through conformational modulation of the Beclin-1 subunit. This activity prevents PI3KC3-directed generation of phosphatidylinositol 3-phosphate (PI3P) at the autophagosome membrane, and a resulting failure to recruit machinery that directs autophagosome-lysosome fusion. Rubicon is targeted to its site of action through direct interaction with Rab7, which decorates late endosomes and late autophagosomes.

Autophagy-independent  
Rubicon is required for LC3-associated phagocytosis (LAP) and LC3-associated endocytosis (LANDO). Rubicon plays a role in PI3KC3 localization to phagosomes, which is important for PI3P production at the membrane and recruitment of downstream effectors including NOX2. 

Rubicon has been shown to suppress the innate immune response and in some cases exacerbate viral replication. Rubicon suppresses cytokine responses through interaction with NF-κB essential modulator (NEMO), interferon regulatory factor 3 (IRF3) and caspase recruitment domain-containing protein 9 (CARD9).

Role in aging and disease

Aging-related diseases 
Rubicon expression levels increase with age in mice and other model organisms, suggesting that Rubicon may cause age-associated decrease of autophagy. Since reduced autophagy is associated with aging and age-related diseases, modulation of Rubicon has been identified as a potential therapeutic target. 

In mice, Rubicon knockout reduces α-synuclein accumulation in the brain and reduces interstitial fibrosis in the kidney.

Aging 
Rubicon knockout increases lifespan in roundworms (C. elegans) through modulation of autophagy, and also increases lifespan in female fruit flies (D. melanogaster).

Nonalcoholic fatty liver disease (NAFLD) 
Rubicon levels are increased in mouse models of nonalcoholic fatty liver disease (NAFLD). Knockout of Rubicon in hepatocytes improves liver steatosis and autophagy, suggesting that Rubicon contributes to NAFLD pathogenesis.

Metabolic disease 
Age-dependent decline of Rubicon expression in adipose tissues may exacerbate metabolic disorders due to excessive autophagic activity.

Salih ataxia (SCAR15) 
A single nucleotide deletion mutation within Rubicon is the cause of Salih ataxia (OMIM ID: 615705). Salih ataxia (also known as spinocerebellar ataxia, autosomal recessive 15 or SCAR15) is a form of spinocerebellar ataxia characterized by progressive loss of coordination of hands, gait, speech, and eye movement. The disease was discovered in children carrying a mutation (c.2624delC p.Ala875ValfsX146) causing a frameshift mutation and an erroneous open reading frame in the Rubicon-coding gene starting from Alanine 875. The resulting disruption of the C-terminal domain impairs Rubicon subcellular localization with Rab7 and late endosomes.

See also 
 PLEKHM1
 RUBCNL (Rubicon-like)
 RAB7A
 Beclin-1

References 

Human genes